Red Deer Catholic Regional Division No. 39 or Red Deer Catholic Regional Schools (RDCRS) is a separate school authority within the Canadian province of Alberta operated out of Red Deer.

Red Deer Catholic Regional Schools is a publicly funded school Division with an elected Board of Trustees and governed by the Alberta Education Act. Our schools welcome children of all faiths who desire a Catholic education. We serve over 9,200 students in 19 schools including an online school and an outreach school. We also serve approximately 600 students in a home education program. Our schools are located in Red Deer, Sylvan Lake, Rocky Mountain House, Innisfail and Olds.

Red Deer Catholic Regional Schools also has an International Student Services program. Since its inception in 2004, the RDCRS International Student Services program has hosted students from a variety of countries, with the majority coming from Latin America, Asia and Europe.

See also 
List of school authorities in Alberta

References

External links 

International Student Services 
 
Red Deer, Alberta
School districts in Alberta